Year 1468 (MCDLXVIII) was a leap year starting on Friday (link will display the full calendar) of the Julian calendar.

Events 
 January–December 
 June 30 – Catherine Cornaro is married by proxy to James II of Cyprus, beginning the Venetian conquest of Cyprus.
 August 26 – Baeda Maryam succeeds his father Zara Yaqob, as Emperor of Ethiopia.
 October 14 – The Treaty of Péronne is signed by Charles the Bold, Duke of Burgundy, and Louis XI of France.
 October 30 – Troops of Charles the Bold conduct the Sack of Liège. 

 Date unknown 
 The Lancastrians surrender Harlech Castle to King Edward IV of England after a seven-year siege.
 The Great Council of the Republic of Venice attempts to curb the power of the Council of Ten through legislation restricting them to acting on emergency matters.
 Orkney is pledged by Christian I, in his capacity as King of Norway, as security against the payment of the dowry of his daughter Margaret, betrothed to James III of Scotland. As the money is never paid, the connection with the crown of Scotland becomes perpetual.
 Fire breaks out at Metz Cathedral in France.
 On about this date, Sonni Ali, king of the Songhai Empire, takes power over Timbuktu.

Births 
 February 29 – Pope Paul III (d. 1549)
 March 28 – Charles I, Duke of Savoy (d. 1490)
 April 27 – Frederick Jagiellon, Primate of Poland (d. 1503)
 May 31 – Philip, Prince of Anhalt-Köthen, German prince (d. 1500)
 June 30 – John, Elector of Saxony (1525–1532) (d. 1532)
 July 24 – Catherine of Saxony, Archduchess of Austria (d. 1524)
 August 3 – Albert I, Duke of Münsterberg-Oels, Count of Kladsko (d. 1511)
 August 26 – Bernardo de' Rossi, Italian bishop (d. 1527)
 December 21 – William Conyers, 1st Baron Conyers, English baron (d. 1524)
 date unknown
 Marino Ascanio Caracciolo, Italian cardinal (d. 1538)
 Mir Chakar Khan Rind, Baloch chieftain (d. 1565)
 Juan de Zumárraga, Spanish Franciscan prelate and first bishop of Mexico (d. 1548)
 probable – Alonso de Ojeda, Spanish conquistador and explorer (d. 1515)

Deaths 

 February 3 – Johannes Gutenberg, inventor of printing press with replaceable letters (b. c.1398)
 March 12 – Astorre II Manfredi, Italian noble (b. 1412)
 September 23 – Sejo of Joseon, King of Joseon (b. 1417)
 June 10 – Idris Imad al-Din, supreme leader of Tayyibi Isma'ilism, scholar and historian (b. 1392)
 June 14 – Margaret Beauchamp, countess of Shrewsbury
 June 30 – Lady Eleanor Talbot, English noblewoman
 July 5 – Alfonso, Prince of Asturias (b. 1453)
 September 26 – Juan de Torquemada, Spanish Catholic cardinal (b. 1388)
 October 7 – Sigismondo Pandolfo Malatesta, lord of Rimini (b. 1417)
 October 28 – Bianca Maria Visconti, Duchess of Milan (b. 1425)
 November 24 – Jean de Dunois, French soldier (b. 1402)
 December 6 – Zanobi Strozzi, Italian painter (b. 1412)
 date unknown
 Joanot Martorell, Spanish writer (b. 1419)
 Francesco Squarcione, Italian artist b(1377)
 Zara Yaqob, Emperor of Ethiopia (b. 1399)
 Pomellina Fregoso, Monegaque regent (b. 1388

References